Menace II Society (The Original Motion Picture Soundtrack) is the soundtrack for Albert and Allen Hughes' 1993 teen hood drama film Menace II Society. It was released on May 26, 1993 via Jive Records, and consists primarily of hip hop music. The album is composed of sixteen songs and features performances by Boogie Down Productions, Brand Nubian, Da Lench Mob, DJ Quik, Hi-Five, Juanita Stokes, Kenya Gruv, MC Eiht of Compton's Most Wanted, Mz Kilo, Pete Rock & CL Smooth, The Cutthroats, The Dangerous Crew, UGK and YG'z.

Along with singles, music videos were produced for the songs: "Trigga Gots No Heart" by Spice 1, "Streiht Up Menace" by MC Eiht, and "Unconditional Love" by Hi-Five.

Several songs heard both in the movie and in the closing credits, such as "Honey Love", "Slow Dance (Hey Mr. DJ)" and "Dedicated" by R. Kelly and Public Announcement, "Fly Away" by Hi-Five, "Love and Happiness" by Al Green, "Dopeman (Remix)" by N.W.A, "Atomic Dog" by George Clinton, "For the Love of You (Part 1)" by The Isley Brothers, "Computer Love" by Zapp, "Stay Strapped in South Central" and "Hot Wire Oldie" by Quincy Jones III, "Got to Give It Up" by Marvin Gaye, "Only the Strong Survive" by Jerry Butler, "Ghetto Bird" by Ice Cube and a remix to "Streiht Up Menace" by MC Eiht, were not included in the soundtrack album.

Critical and commercial performance

The soundtrack peaked at number 11 on the Billboard 200 and at number 1 on the Top R&B/Hip-Hop Albums chart in the United States. It was certified gold by the Recording Industry Association of America on July 27, 1993 and has been certified platinum since October 11, 1994.

Its lead single, "Trigga Gots No Heart", made it to number 71 on the Hot R&B/Hip-Hop Songs and number 9 on the Hot Rap Songs. The second single, "Streiht Up Menace", peaked at number 72 on the Billboard Hot 100 and at number 46 on the Hot R&B/Hip-Hop Songs. Its third and final single, "Unconditional Love", reached number 92 on the Billboard Hot 100 and number 21 on the Hot R&B/Hip-Hop Songs.

Complex placed the album at number 9 on their 25 Best Hip-Hop Movie Soundtracks Of All Time.

Track listing 

Sample credits
Track 3 contains elements from "Eazy-Duz-It" by Eazy-E
Track 8 contains elements from "Sunny" by Wes Montgomery

See also
List of number-one R&B albums of 1993 (U.S.)

Charts

Weekly charts

Year-end charts

Certifications

References

External links 

1993 soundtrack albums
Hip hop soundtracks
Gangsta rap soundtracks
Jive Records soundtracks
Rhythm and blues soundtracks
Albums produced by Guru
Albums produced by DJ Quik
Albums produced by E-A-Ski
Albums produced by MC Eiht
Albums produced by Ant Banks
Albums produced by Pete Rock
Albums produced by Cold 187um
Albums produced by DJ Premier
Albums produced by Quincy Jones III
Albums produced by Chris Stokes (director)
Drama film soundtracks